Listronotus suturalis is a species of underwater weevil in the family Curculionidae. It is found in North America.

References

Further reading

 
 
 
 
 
 
 
 
 
 
 
 
 

Cyclominae